Doctor Syn (Dr. Syn in the United States) is a 1937 British black-and-white historical dramatic adventure film, directed by Roy William Neill for Gainsborough Pictures. It stars George Arliss (in his last feature film), Margaret Lockwood, Graham Moffatt, and Ronald Shiner. The film is based on the Doctor Syn novels of Russell Thorndike, set in 18th century Kent. The character of Syn and the events at the film's climax were both softened considerably in comparison to Thorndike's original storyline.

Plot
Led by Captain Collyer, a detachment of Royal Navy tax revenue collectors arrive in the village of Dymchurch on Romney Marsh. The area is known for liquor-smuggling, and they are on the trail of the culprits. They find a peaceful village of apparently honest, pious, and simple folk, looked after benevolently by their philanthropic vicar, Doctor Syn.

Dr Syn is in fact The Scarecrow, the leader of the band of parish smugglers. He uses his cover as a man of the cloth to run a profitable smuggling ring, whose profits are used to improve the lives of the local citizenry by paying their heavy tax burden imposed by the Crown. Collyer gradually comes to suspect what is going on, after which a series of chases and confrontations takes place. The Scarecrow and his smugglers narrowly outwit their Royal Navy pursuers on the surrounding marshlands.
 
Captain Collyer finally discovers that Syn is none other than the notorious pirate Captain Clegg, thought to have been hanged many years earlier and buried in the graveyard at Dymchurch. Still one step ahead of the Collyer and his men, Syn destroys all incriminating evidence, after which he and his smugglers disappear, making their escape from England by merchant ship.

Cast
 George Arliss as Doctor Syn
 Margaret Lockwood as Imogene Clegg
 John Loder as Denis Cobtree
 Roy Emerton as Captain Howard Collyer
 Graham Moffatt as Jerry Jerk
 George Merritt as Mipps
 Athole Stewart as Squire Cobtree
 Frederick Burtwell as Rash
 Wilson Coleman as Dr. Pepper
 Wally Patch as Bo'sun
 Muriel George as Mrs. Waggetts
 Meinhart Maur as Mulatto
 Alan Whittaker (uncredited double for George Arliss in some scenes)

Production
This was the last film of George Arliss' contract with Gaumont British. "He is a quite good parson and there is virtue even in his smuggling", said Arliss. "I think we can make him quite an amusing character, and the subject is picturesque and dramatic".

The film was announced in April, taking place at Gaumont British's studio at Islington. There was some location work in Dymchurch and the marshes around Rye and Winchelsea.

Anna Lee was to play the female lead. She was replaced by Margaret Lockwood who impressed with her performance so much she was offered a three-year contract by Gainsborough Pictures. This was a key turning point in Lockwood's career.

Music
There are two songs used in the film:
 "Heavenly Home" (hymn sung by congregation in the opening church scene)
 "Come Landlord fill the Flowing Bowl" (traditional drinking song)

Home media
Dr. Syn was released in the U.S. on a public domain Region 1 DVD-R in 2014. Product code: 6 44827 11062 9

References

External links
 
 
 
 
Dr Syn at TCMDB

1937 films
1930s adventure drama films
1930s historical adventure films
British black-and-white films
British historical adventure films
British adventure drama films
Films directed by Roy William Neill
Films produced by Michael Balcon
Gainsborough Pictures films
Films based on multiple works
Films based on British novels
Films set in the 1790s
Films set in Kent
Films set on beaches
Islington Studios films
Films scored by Jack Beaver
1937 drama films
1930s English-language films
1930s British films